Christy Marx is an American scriptwriter, author, and game designer, especially narrative designer. She is best known for her work on various TV series including Jem, Teenage Mutant Ninja Turtles, Conan the Adventurer, G.I. Joe, Hypernauts, and Captain Power. She is also known for her comic book work, including her original comic book series Sisterhood of Steel as well as work on Conan, Red Sonja, and Elfquest. Marx has also authored several biographies and history books.

Career
Marx's first published work in the comics industry was "Master of Shadows", a 17-page Red Sonja story in Savage Sword of Conan #45, October, 1979.

She would make her debut in the gaming industry with both writing and designing with Conquests of Camelot in 1990, and followed it with the sequel Conquests of the Longbow.

She began working at Zynga in late 2010, where she continued to work with games such as Hidden Chronicles. She left the company in 2017.

In June 2012, it was announced that Marx would be writing the character of Amethyst, Princess of Gemworld in a revival of the comic book series Sword of Sorcery, which was released in August 2013.

She has also authored a writing manual, Writing for Animation, Comics, and Games. The book covers how to write for multiple mediums and formats.

Personal life
Marx's first husband, Peter Ledger, was an illustrator. The computer game Conquests of Camelot and the Sisterhood of Steel graphic novel features his art.

Awards 
 In 2000, Marx won the Animation Writers Caucus Animation Award from the Writers Guild of America for her contributions to the field of animation writing.
 Best Computer Adventure game 1990, by Video Games and Computer Entertainment Magazine, for Conquests of Camelot: The Search for the Holy Grail  
 Best Adventure game 1991, by Computer Game Review and Enchanted Realms, for Conquests of the Longbow: The Legend of Robin Hood
 Marx was part of the team that won a 2006 Distinguished Achievement Award from the Association of Educational Publishers for the Harcourt Achieve Steck-Vaughn IMPACT Graphic Novels series

Publications

Books 
 Life in the Ocean Depths (Life in Extreme Environments) 2003
 Watson and Crick and DNA (Primary Sources of Revolutionary Scientific Discoveries and Theories) 2005 
 The Great Chicago Fire of 1871 (Tragic Fires Throughout History) 2004 
 Jet Li (Martial Arts Masters) 2002 
 Writing for Animation, Comics, and Games 2007

Comics 
 Sword of Sorcery Volume 1: Amethyst, 2013 
 Birds of Prey #27, 2014 
 Convergence: Zero Hour Book 1, published in 2015

Filmography

Television 
(series head writer denoted in bold)
The New Fantastic Four (1978)
Spider-Man (1981-1982)
Spider-Man and His Amazing Friends (1981-1982)
G.I. Joe: A Real American Hero (1985)
Jem (1985-1988)
Captain Power and the Soldiers of the Future (1988)
Teenage Mutant Ninja Turtles (1988)
Dino-Riders (1988)
The Twilight Zone (1989)
G.I. Joe: A Real American Hero (1990)
Bucky O’Hare and the Toad Wars (1991)
Conan the Adventurer (1992-1993)
Babylon 5 (1994)
Mighty Max (1994)
Darkstalkers (1995)
Hypernauts (1996)
Captain Simian & the Space Monkeys (1997)
ReBoot (1997)
Pocket Dragon Adventures (1998)
Beast Wars: Transformers (1998)
Shadow Raiders (1998-1999)
Roswell Conspiracies: Aliens, Myths and Legends (1999)
Kong: The Animated Series (2000)
X-Men: Evolution (2001)
Ultimate Book of Spells (2001)
Stargate Infinity (2002)
He-Man and the Masters of the Universe (2003)
Alien Racers (2005)
Zorro: Generation Z (2006)
Legend of the Dragon (2006)
Dork Hunters from Outer Space (2008)

Film 
What Waits Below (1984)
20,000 Leagues Under the Sea (2002)

Video games
Conquests of Camelot: The Search for the Grail (1990)
Conquests of the Longbow: The Legend of Robin Hood (1991)
The Legend of Alon D'ar (2001)
Tao Feng: Fist of the Lotus (2003)
CSI: Hard Evidence (2007)
The Lord of the Rings: War in the North (2011)

References

External links

Christy Marx at MobyGames

American comics writers
American television writers
American video game designers
American women screenwriters
American women television writers
Female comics writers
Living people
People from Danville, Illinois
Screenwriters from Illinois
Screenwriting instructors
Sierra On-Line employees
Video game writers
Women video game designers
20th-century American screenwriters
20th-century American women writers
21st-century American women
Year of birth missing (living people)